Maria João David da Silva Bastos (born 18 June 1975) is a Portuguese actress. She has participated in several Brazilian productions, becoming a known actress in Brazil.

Biography
Maria João was born in Benavente, Santarém District. She holds a degree in Communication Sciences from the Independent University of Lisbon. Maria took an English course in England in 1993, a casting and video and dummy course at Visual LX in 1994 and a theater, film and television course in New York City in the year 2000. She signed an exclusive contract with The Portuguese television station, TVI.

Bastos is ambassador of the Jaguar car brand, and representative of the Italian brand Furla, in Portugal. Her character "Liliane Marise", in the novel Destinos Cruzados, was so remarkable that it released a CD that reached first place in the top of Portugal. Incarnating this same personage, also it made a concert in MEO Arena, in Lisbon, October 2013, and another in Guimarães, in the same month. In 2015 she was juror of the Ídolos program at SIC.

She was the winner of the 2011 Portuguese Golden Globe as Best Film Actress for her performance in the film Mysteries of Lisbon.

Filmography

Television

Film 
 A Ponte na Califórnia, realization of Pedro Amorim (2016), Short film
 Casanova Variations, realization of Michael Sturminger (2014)
 Bairro, realization of Jorge Cardoso, Lourenço de Mello, José Manuel Fernandes and Ricardo Inácio (2013)
 Linhas de Wellington, realização de Valeria Sarmiento (2012)
 Em Câmara Lenta, realization of Fernando Lopes (2012)
 Intriga Fatal, realization of António Borges Correia (2012), TV movie
 Catarina e os Outros, realization of André Badalo (2011), Short film
 Je M'Appelle Bernadette, realization of Jean Sagols (2011)
 A Moral Conjugal, realization of Artur Serra Araújo (2011)
 Mistérios de Lisboa, realization of Raul Ruiz (2010)
 Shoot Me, realization of André Badalo (2009), Short film
 O Último Condenado à Morte, realization of Francisco Manso (2009)
 O Inimigo sem Rosto, realization of José Farinha (2005)
 O Elevador, realization of Patrícia Sequeira (2005), Short film
 O Veneno da Madrugada, realization of Ruy Guerra - Brazil (2005)
 Cavaleiros de Água Doce, realization of Tiago Guedes (2001),TV movie
 Alta Fidelidade, realization of Tiago Guedes and Frederico Serra (2000), TV movie

 Stage 
 O Método de Gronholm, staging of Virgílio Castelo (2005)

 Presentation of shows 
 Presenter of show Wella, Lisbon (1997)
 Presenter of gala Globos de Ouro'', SIC (2003)
 Presenter of the trophy delivery of the national sport, SIC (2004)
 Gala hostess "Fashion Model Awards", Fashion TV and SIC (2004)

Advertising 
 Mustela (1997)
 Mimosa
 TMN
 Optimus
 Daewoo
 Cerveja CoolBeer
 CTT (2004)
 Daníssimo (2005)
 Páginas Amarelas (2005)
 Cerveja Sagres (2013)

References

External links 

 
 

1975 births
Living people
People from Benavente, Portugal
Portuguese television actresses
Portuguese film actresses
Portuguese stage actresses
Portuguese expatriates in Brazil